The 2007 Formula Renault 2.0 Northern European Cup was the second Formula Renault 2.0 Northern European Cup season. The season began at Zandvoort on 28 May and finished on 21 October at Hockenheim, after sixteen races.

Motopark Academy driver Frank Kechele won the NEC championship title, having won eight races during the season, bringing the team their second successive drivers' championship title.

Drivers and teams

Race calendar and results

Standings

Drivers

† — Drivers did not finish the race, but were classified as they completed over 90% of the race distance.

Teams

References

External links
 Official website of the Formula Renault 2.0 NEC championship

NEC
Formula Renault 2.0 NEC
Formula Renault 2.0 NEC
Renault NEC